The Sturt Football Club, nicknamed The Double Blues, is a semi-professional Australian rules football club based in the suburb of Unley, South Australia, which plays in the South Australian National Football League.

Founded in 1901 by the Sturt Cricket Club, the club initially struggled to make the finals, however, in 1915 they won their first Premiership. After several decades of substantial finals appearances and a few premiership wins, Sturt entered a period of success, winning seven premierships from 1966 to 1976 under coach Jack Oatey.

Sturt has a total of 15 premierships, eleven Magarey Medallists and two Night Premierships.

Sturt wear Oxford and Cambridge Blue reflecting the street names on which their home ground is based. Sturt play their home games at the 15,000 capacity Unley Oval and their club song is named It's a grand old flag.

History

Establishment 
The Sturt Football club was established on 14 March 1901 following a meeting convened at the Unley Town Hall by the Sturt Cricket Club (established on August 9, 1890 by Arthur C Thomas) and attended by delegates from local junior teams, footballers and residents it was decided to establish a senior football club in the Sturt Electoral Division based around Unley to join the SAFA. Sturt is named after the Australian explorer Charles Sturt. The club used the two shades of blue of Oxford and Cambridge Universities as its home ground, Unley Oval, is situated on the junction of Oxford Terrace and Cambridge Terrace, hence the nickname of "Double Blues". Sturt played its first SAFA game against Norwood at Norwood Oval, losing by 33 points.

Sturt enjoyed little success initially and struggled to make the finals. In 1909, the club was strengthened by a number of interstate players enticed by offers of employment and accommodation and in 1910, Sturt played in their first Grand Final, losing to Port Adelaide.

First success 

The first premiership came in 1915 with a two-goal Grand Final win over Port Adelaide. The competition was suspended during the First World War, being established in 1919 when Sturt faced North Adelaide in the Grand Final. Despite giving up a big lead early, Sturt fought back and forced a draw. In a low scoring replay the following week, Sturt kicked its only three goals of the match in the last quarter (the last coming with thirty seconds remaining) to win by five points (23–18) and secure consecutive premierships four years apart.

Sturt won another premiership in 1926 defeating North Adelaide again by 64–51, with Vic Richardson after he was not selected for the 1925 Ashes cricket tour of England.

Between 1930 and 1941, Sturt played in five Grand Finals, winning in 1932 (v. North Adelaide by 110–69) and 1940 when the team beat South Adelaide (100–79). From 1942 to 1944, Sturt combined with South Adelaide to compete in a restricted wartime competition.

Golden era 
From 1945 to 1961, despite the efforts of triple Magarey Medalist Len Fitzgerald, Sturt performed poorly, "winning" five wooden spoons and failing to make a Grand Final. In 1962, former Norwood and South Melbourne player and West Adelaide coach Jack Oatey was appointed coach and began to institute an innovative style of play that would modernise the game and influence the style of football played Australia wide.

Sturt showed gradual improvement in Oatey's first years, finishing 6th in 1963 and third in 1964. In 1965, it reached the grand final and before 62,543 (a SANFL record until 1976 and the highest Adelaide Oval crowd to this day), fell short by just 3 points against Port Adelaide. In 1966, Sturt gained revenge on Port Adelaide, doubling its score (16.16 to 8.8) winning its first premiership in 26 years and entering a period of dominance that saw them win seven premierships in eleven years, including five in a row between 1966 and 1970.

Sturt's 1967 and 1968 grand final wins were again at the expense of Port Adelaide. Sturt won the 1969 Grand Final beating Glenelg who had included the Richmond star Royce Hart for his only game for the club. Hart was eligible to play in the SANFL due to his posting to Adelaide as a National Service soldier. Sturt completed its fifth successive premiership with another win over Glenelg in a rain-affected 1970 grand final.

The 1976 Grand Final win over Port Adelaide was dominated by ruckman Rick Davies. Before a record Football Park crowd of 66,897, Sturt entered the final as rank outsiders. Davies, sensing early pressure from Port, positioned himself in the back lines in the first quarter. In an often quoted anecdote, coach Jack Oatey turned to runner David ( Daffy ) Edwards and said:'What's he doing down there? I didn't put him down there. I run this side. Go and ask him what he thinks he's up to." After Davies had taken his fourth strong mark, Edwards came back with the news: "He says he's down there getting kicks, that's where the ball is". Oatey's response: "Course he is. He's a champion isn't he?” Rick Davies dominated the final with 21 kicks, 21 handballs, 21 hit outs and 15 marks, with Sturt winning by 41 points. Captain Paul Bagshaw described the win as "Sturt's finest hour".

Jack Oatey's legacy has continued to influence football in South Australia. Since their inception into the AFL, the Adelaide Crows have embodied much of the approach to the game that Oatey pioneered. Oatey is also credited with popularising the checkside punt, a kicking style that causes the ball to bend away from the body. In the 1968 Grand Final against Port Adelaide Football Club, Peter Endersbee used the checkside punt to kick two goals in the space of a few minutes turning the game in Sturt's favour. Since 1981, the Jack Oatey Medal has been awarded to the best player in the SANFL Grand Final.

Drought 

After Oatey's retirement at the end 1982, Sturt under coaches John Halbert and former Richmond star Mervyn Keane reached the Grand Final of 1983 with a reinvented Davies kicking 151 goals, but fluctuated in the following five years. Committee dissatisfaction with Keane, however, led to Sturt churning through five coaches and receiving a SANFL record eight consecutive wooden spoons  between 1989 and 1996, including a winless season in 1995 when the team actually did not get within four goals of any of its twenty-two opponents. A joint bid with Norwood in 1994 to enter the AFL was rejected in favour of Port Adelaide. Facing financial difficulties, mergers with South Adelaide ("Southern Blues") and North Adelaide were proposed by the SANFL and the club's board. This was opposed by supporters who, along with former players, raised the required $250,000 in two weeks to keep the club in existence. Sturt returned to its original home ground Unley Oval in 1998, having moved its home games to Adelaide Oval from 1986.

Resurgence 
Under Phil Carman, Sturt reached the Grand Final in 1998, losing to Port Adelaide by nine points. Damian Squire was recruited from North Adelaide the following year and won consecutive Magarey medals in 1999–2000. Jade Sheedy and Tim Weatherald went on to share the award in 2002. Sturt, under first-year coach Brenton Phillips, played Central Districts in the 2002 SANFL Grand Final. After struggling to beat Central Districts in four prior attempts in the 2002 season, the Double Blues emerged triumphant on Grand Final day, doubling the Bulldogs' score to win by 47 points. It was the club's first premiership in 26 years.

Six days after the win, several of the club's players and support staff were celebrating the win at the Sari Club in Bali when the Bali bombing incident occurred. Player Josh Deegan and trainer Bob Marshall were killed.

Near-closure and Back-to-Back Premierships 
Sturt finished fifth in 2010 and 9th in 2011. After champion goal kicker Brant Chambers departed at the end of Season 2010, the club endured disappointing seasons in 2011 and 2012, finishing bottom in each year. Poor results in both seasons plus off field mismanagement resulted in a club debt of $2.2 million and almost saw the club to the grave, as reports in early 2013 stated that the club "went perilously close to closing its doors". Sturt finished seventh in 2013, but returned to the finals in 2014 finishing 3rd after the minor round only to lose in straight sets to Norwood and South Adelaide in the Qualifying and 1st Semi Finals. In 2015, Sturt finished 8th with the poor result bringing on the departure of then part-time coach Seamus Maloney.

2016 saw Sturt mount a resurgence under new coach and former premiership player Martin Mattner. The Blues Finished 3rd after the home and away season and started the final series by beating South Adelaide in the Qualifying final. They then lost to the Eagles in the second semi final but won
the Preliminary Final against the Adelaide Crows a week later, by 35 points to set up a Grand Final match against Eagles. They then went on to win the 2016 premiership. The following year the Double Blues recovered from a disappointing start to their season going 0-4 to finish in the top 3 once again. They accounted for Central in the Qualifying final, lost to Port Adelaide in the Second Semi final and beat the red hot favorites the Eagles in the Preliminary final to set up a Grand Final against arch rival Port Adelaide. Sturt then went on to claim a thrilling one-point win against Port Adelaide in the 2017 Grand Final, achieving the rare back-to-back premiers feat.

Sturt entered a team in the SANFL Women's competition in 2018.

Home Grounds 
From the club's inception in 1901 until 1986, the Sturt Football Club played their home games at the Unley Oval. The largest attendance at Unley was set in Round 9 of the 1968 season when 22,015 crammed into the oval to see Sturt play long time rivals Port Adelaide. The unofficial ground record attendance at Unley was set on 9 June 1924 when an estimated 24,000 saw Sturt play Norwood.

In 1987 the club moved its home games to the Adelaide Oval, a move that proved unpopular with fans. After the move, the City of Unley turned the oval into a public park by removing the boundary fence, though the Jack Oatey Stand and the Members Stand remained in place. In 1996, the club negotiated with the Unley council for a return to Unley and after playing a couple of games there in 1997, Sturt permanently moved back to their original home in 1998 which coincided with the club's first Grand Final appearance since 1983.

Before 2014, Sturt was forced to hire Unley Oval for each SANFL home game, due to the councils wish that the oval remain a public park as well as paying for temporary fencing to be erected for each home game. The use of temporary fencing ended in 2014 when a white picket fence was erected at the oval.

Unley Oval was renamed Peter Motley Oval in 2015 in honour of the former two-time Sturt club champion.

Unley Oval (1901–1986, 1997–present)
Adelaide Oval (1987–1997)

Club records 
Record Attendance at Unley Oval (confirmed): 22,015 v Port Adelaide in Round 9, 1968
Record Attendance: 66,897 v Port Adelaide at Football Park, 1976 SANFL Grand Final
Record Attendance since Adelaide Football Club formation (1991): 44,838 v Port Adelaide at Football Park, 1998 SANFL Grand Final
Most Games: 360 by Paul Bagshaw (1964–80)
Most Goals in a Season: 151 by Rick Davies in 1983
Most Goals for the Club: 672 by Brant Chambers (2001–10)
First player to kick 100 goals in an SANFL season: Ted Biggs (1934)
Most Years as Coach: 21 by Jack Oatey (1962–1982)
Most Years as Captain: 8 by Paul Bagshaw (1973–1980) and Chris Thredgold (1995–2002)
Most Premierships as Captain: 3 by John Halbert (1966, 1967, 1968)
Most Best & Fairest Awards: 7 by Rick Davies (1973, 1974, 1975, 1976, 1978, 1979, 1980)
Highest Score: 32.19 (211) v Woodville 19.14 (128) at Woodville Oval in Round 4, 1974

Honours

Club

Individual

Magarey Medalists

Jack Oatey Medalists

Hall of Fame 
Sturt launched its Hall of Fame in 2004, with 19 inaugural inductees. There were further inductions in 2006 and 2009. Like other SANFL clubs, the players and officials are divided into broad historical eras during which they represented the club.

 Members with names in bold are also in the South Australian Football Hall of Fame
 Members with an asterisk* next to their names are also in the Australian Football Hall of Fame

Team of the Century

Current playing list

Club song 
The Sturt Football Club's song is "It's A Grand Old Flag".

Sung to tune of "You're A Grand Old Flag".

It's a Grand old flag, It's a high-flying flag
It's the emblem for me and for you
It's the emblem of the team we love
The team of the old Double Blues
Every heart beats true for the old Double Blues
As we sing this song to you.........what do we sing?
Should old acquaintance be forgot
Oh keep your eye on the Old Double Blues!

References

External links 

 
 The Sturt Football Club Scrapbook & Supporters Forum
 Full Points Footy History of Sturt Football Club

South Australian National Football League clubs
SANFL Women's League
Australian rules football clubs in South Australia
1901 establishments in Australia
Australian rules football clubs established in 1901